William Short, DD (c. 1760 – 23 May 1826) was the Archdeacon of Cornwall from 1807 until his death.

Short was born in Exeter and educated at Christ Church, Oxford, where he matriculated in 1778 at age 18, and graduated B.A. in 1782. He held livings at Wortley and Teignmouth.

References

Archdeacons of Cornwall
18th-century English Anglican priests
19th-century English Anglican priests
Alumni of Christ Church, Oxford
1826 deaths
Clergy from Exeter